"The Truth" is a song by the Christian rock band Relient K. It was their only single from the Apathetic EP, and was only their second single to ever be released off an EP that was only found on an EP, the first being "A Penny Loafer Saved, A Penny Loafer Earned" from the Employee of the Month EP. Both songs were released for Christian radio. The song was ranked at #21 in ChristianRock.Net's annual top 100, and made it into the top 5 on their weekly top 30.

The Relient K song "In Like A Lion (Always Winter)" (also found on The Apathetic EP]) is based on the book The Lion, the Witch, and the Wardrobe. It was originally written in case the band was asked to do a song for the same movie's "Music Inspired By" album. "The Truth" was written for the same reason, but the words were changed for the song once the band realized that neither song would make it onto the album. Both songs were then placed onto the EP. Matt Thiessen said that "The Truth" was originally about how everyone wouldn't believe the character of Lucy, although she'd never lied to them before, but he then changed it to fit a relationship with God.

2005 singles
Relient K songs
Songs written by Matt Thiessen
2005 songs
Capitol Records singles